Bhangura Union High School also spelt Bhangoora Union High School is the oldest secondary school in the Bhangura Upazila, Bangladesh. Previously it was called Bhangura Union Multilateral Boy's High School.  It is located in the heart of Bhangura town. 

It was founded in Parshodangla of Chatmohar Upazila in 1926. It shifted to the current location in 1938 and upgraded as a secondary school, so 1938 is considered as the year of establishment. In 1942 the first students sat their Matriculation Exam and all passed. 

The school now has one thousand students and sixteen teachers.

Notable alumni 
 Member of Parliament Md. Mokbul Hossain
 Former High Commissioner to Australia Hosen Ali

Educational institutions established in 1926
High schools in Bangladesh
Schools in Pabna District
1926 establishments in India